Virginia Commonwealth University School of the Arts in Qatar (VCUarts Qatar) is Virginia Commonwealth University’s Qatari branch of its School of the Arts. The main campus is located in Richmond, Virginia. VCUarts Qatar is located at Education City in Doha, Qatar. VCUarts Qatar is accredited by the National Association of Schools of Art & Design, the Southern Association of Colleges and Schools, and the Council for Interior Design Accreditation.

History 
VCUarts Qatar was the first campus established in Education City in 1998. It has since been joined by Georgetown University School of Foreign Service, Weill Cornell Medical College, Texas A&M, Carnegie Mellon University, Northwestern University, HEC Paris, and University College London. VCUarts Qatar renewed its contract in July 2012 and it is in effect through June 2022.

Funding 
VCUarts Qatar is funded by Qatar Foundation for Education, Science, and Community Development, a semi-private non-profit organization founded by then-emir Sheikh Hamad bin Khalifa Al Thani and his second wife and mother of current emir, Moza bint Nasser.

Aside from funding of the campus in Qatar and the management fee that the university receives as profit, universities who agree to open branches in Qatar are often the recipients of endowed chairs at the U.S. campuses.

In 2014, the estimated budget of VCUarts Qatar provided to VCU by Qatar Foundation was nearly $42 million. On top of that, undergraduate tuition was almost $25,000.

Degrees offered 
VCUarts Qatar offers Bachelor of Fine Arts degrees in fashion design, graphic design, interior design, and painting & printmaking, a Bachelor of Arts degree in art history, and a Master of Fine Arts degree in design.

Transcripts from VCUarts Qatar indicate that the courses were completed in Qatar, but the diploma is issued by VCU in Richmond, Virginia.

Student life 
VCUarts Qatar has 379 students representing 36 nationalities between its undergraduate and graduate students.

The university was originally opened for women, but in 2008 began also accepting men.

Per VCU's agreement with Qatar Foundation, at least 70% of admitted students must be Qatari citizens.

Facilities 
In 2010, a major expansion project allowed VCUarts Qatar to more than double its facilities, integrating its undergraduate and graduate programs under one roof. The expansion also extended the technical spaces to include a media lab, digital fabrication lab, printmaking studios, a photography studio, an expanded library and the region's first materials library.

Leadership 
The school is advised by a Joint Advisory Board, which per the agreement with Qatar Foundation must be composed of three members appointed by each VCU and Qatar Foundation and three independent members which are jointly appointed by VCU and Qatar Foundation.

References

Universities in Qatar
American international schools